Scyloxes is a monotypic genus of Tajikistani spitting spiders containing the single species, Scyloxes asiatica. It was first described by P. M. Dunin in 1992, and is found in Tajikistan.

See also
 List of Scytodidae species

References

Monotypic Araneomorphae genera
Scytodidae
Spiders of Asia